The Last Descent is a 2016 American biographical survival drama film co-written and directed by Isaac Halasima, and is his first feature-length film. It is based on the 2009 rescue attempt of John Edward Jones in Nutty Putty Cave, west of Utah Lake. The film was produced by Deep Blue Films, Cocollala Pictures, and Dark Rider Productions and distributed by Excel Entertainment Group. It stars Chadwick Hopson, Alexis Johnson, Landon Henneman, Jyllian Petrie, and Jacob Omer.

Plot 
In 2009, John Jones, a 26-year-old medical student and experienced caver, arrives in Utah for the Thanksgiving weekend with his wife Emily and young daughter Lizzie. They are picked up by John's brother Josh, who tells him that the Nutty Putty Cave has been opened after having been closed before. Emily approves because of John's enthusiasm and he and Josh go to explore the cave. After Emily leaves with Josh's car, the two brothers enter the cave. John makes a decision to split up and explore an un-mapped route. As he goes deeper into the cave, he gets stuck in a small passageway. As he tries to go back and free himself, he falls into an even smaller hole and passes out.

John wakes up upside down in an 18-inch wide hole and realizes he is completely stuck. He manages to alert Josh to his location, who then tries to pull John out himself but is unsuccessful. Josh, at John's behest, reluctantly leaves him to go get help. While alone, John passes out again due to his upside down position.
Hours later, he is woken by Susie, a rescue worker. She tells him many rescuers are on the scene and are doing their best to get him out. Susie then climbs back up to the entrance where she meets with an expert who states that if John is in the tunnel for extended periods of time, his body will begin to shut down. Soon another rescuer, Aaron is brought to the scene. He has been involved in past rescues that have ended tragically, and he vows to not leave without rescuing John.

Aaron climbs down and finds John, whose condition is starting to deteriorate. He assures John that everything will be all right, and promises him that he'll get out of the cave. John falls asleep and has a vision of his daughter in a field, but with an older man wearing grey clothing, whom he has seen before in hallucinations, after which he wakes up and suffers a panic attack. Aaron manages to calm him down, but not before John injures himself. John begins to talk to Aaron about his relationship with Emily. His conversation is overshadowed with flashbacks from when he first met Emily to them dating. That night, Josh drives Emily to the entrance of the cave where he convinces the lead rescuers into letting her stay at the entrance.

John's condition continues to worsen as the hours go by. Aaron, Susie and other workers plan to pull John out of the hole by drilling pulleys into the walls and hooking the ropes to his feet. Aaron continues to talk to John, occasionally feeding him Gatorade to keep him hydrated. John continues to tell him about his relationship with Emily, and reveals that when he first proposed to her she declined, and his family did not take to it kindly. He still continued to date her, amid rising tensions between her and his family. A radio is lowered into the cave and John is able to speak with Emily, who reveals she is pregnant. Shortly afterwards, he suffers another panic attack. While talking with Aaron again, they each realize they both served Later Day Saints missions in Spanish speaking countries. They both sing "Come Thou Fount of Every Blessing" in Spanish.

The drilling is finished and the attempt to pull John out commences. However, as John is starting to get pulled out, one of the drills come undone, making dirt explode in all directions, and resulting in John falling back in the hole. The workers rescue an injured Aaron, who struggles to get back to the cave, distraught over another failure and the loss of his new friend. Emily mourns at the entrance, and is able to speak with John one last time. Emily talks with him for a minute before John seemingly dies. 

Some time later, John suddenly awakens, and to his surprise, has the strength to push himself out of the hole. He calls for Aaron and Susie and finds the pulley ropes. He notices that the injuries he sustained have disappeared. As he finds his way back to the entrance, he finds it deserted and realizes he has died and is now a spirit in the afterlife. Saddened, John goes back to the cave.

In the cave, John encounters another spirit in the form of an infant. As he talks to the baby, he realizes the baby is his soon to be born son. He then reflects on the hallucinations and visions of the boy and man in grey with Emily and Lizzie. He realizes that man was always his son, and tearfully tells the infant to watch over his mother and sister. As he takes the baby from his cradle and exits the cave, the boy is born at a hospital and is placed into Emily's arms, who happily announces that she has named him after John. Epilogue captions state that the cave's entrance has since been sealed, with John's body still inside, and provides a thank you to the rescuers from the family.

Cast
Chadwick Hopson as John Jones, a medical student who gets stuck in an 18-inch wide hole in Nutty Putty Cave.
Alexis "Lexy" Johnson as Emily Jones, John's wife.
Landon Henneman as Aaron, a veteran rescue worker who is distraught over past rescues that have ended tragically. He is a composite character of the many workers who conversed with John during the attempted rescue.
Jyllian Petrie as Susie, one of the rescue workers, also a composite character.
Jacob Omer as Josh Jones, John's brother.
Mason D. Davis as Man in Dark, a hallucination John has seen over the course of his life. The man is later revealed to be the spirit of his unborn son.
Paul Tan as Dr. Doug Murdock, a medical expert who provides information warning the rescuers of John's condition in the cave.
Mark Webb as Sheriff Hodgson, the leader in the rescuing effort.
Kendrey Flake as Lizzie, John's young daughter.

Production
Filming took place entirely in Utah, with exterior shots of the cave at the actual entrance, with the interior holes and twists recreated in a warehouse in West Valley.

Release
The film had a limited release in Arizona, Utah and Idaho on September 16, 2016.

Reception

The film had a limited release but received generally positive reviews, with praise for its direction, acting and cinematography, but received some criticism for its tone and pacing.

References

External links
 

2016 films
2016 biographical drama films
2016 independent films
2010s survival films
American biographical drama films
American independent films
American survival films
American psychological drama films
American docudrama films
Films based on biographies
Films set in 2009
Films set in Utah
2016 drama films
2010s English-language films
2010s American films